Brainchild of Sheffield promoter Leighton, Resistanz is an industrial music festival running since 2011 over the Easter weekend, at the Corporation venue in Sheffield, United Kingdom. Held annually until 2016, the event was due to take place in 2020 but has been rescheduled for 2022 due to Coronavirus. The festival primarily features alternative electronic music acts including industrial, EBM, futurepop, synthpop and power noise. In later years the festival expanded to include a smaller second room featuring an eclectic mix of artists from genres such as Chiptune, EDM and Drum and bass.

Event Line-Ups

See also

List of industrial music festivals
List of electronic music festivals

References

External links

Music festivals established in 2011
Electronic music festivals in the United Kingdom
Industrial music festivals
Music in Sheffield